Dejan Srbinovski (born February 3, 1997) is a Macedonian professional basketball coach who is currently head coach at MZT Skopje Aerodrom U16 team, assistant coach at MZT Skopje Aerodrom and Macedonian National Team U16. He started his coaching career at season 2021/22 in KK Feniks 2010 as assistant coach.

In his first season as assistant coach he won the national championship 2021/22.

Dejan Srbinovski is a former Macedonian professional basketball player who was playing for KK Vardar, KK Kumanovo, KK FMP Akademija and KK Feniks 2010.

Professional career
On April 4, 2018, he made his debut for Kumanovo against AV Ohrid. On April 11, 2018, he scored 2 points, 2 rebounds and 2 assists in 83-82 home win against Rabotnički

References

External links
 Eurobasket Profile
 Realgm Profile

1997 births
Sportspeople from Skopje
Point guards
Macedonian men's basketball players
Living people